Delomys is a genus of South American rodents in the tribe Thomasomyini of family Cricetidae. Four species are known, all found in the Atlantic Forest of Argentina and Brazil. They are as follows:

 Delomys altimontanus
 Montane Atlantic Forest rat (Delomys collinus)
 Striped Atlantic Forest rat (Delomys dorsalis)
 Pallid Atlantic Forest rat (Delomys sublineatus)

References 

 
Rodent genera
Taxa named by Oldfield Thomas